Janet Cohen may refer to:

 Janet Neel Cohen, Baroness Cohen of Pimlico (born 1940), British lawyer, crime fiction writer, and member of the House of Lords
 Janet Langhart Cohen (born 1940), American model, television journalist, and author